The Democratic Party of Equatorial Guinea (abbreviated PDGE) is the ruling political party in Equatorial Guinea. It was established by President Teodoro Obiang Nguema Mbasogo on 11 October 1987.

Prior to 1991, the PDGE was the sole legal political organization in the country. Still, the PDGE has been the dominant party since its inception, and it typically wins almost all seats in the Parliament. In the 2004 legislative election, 98 of 100 seats were won by either PDGE members or "opposition" parties that support Obiang; in the 2008 legislative election, the PDGE and its allies won a total of 99 out of 100 seats. Similarly, Obiang typically wins 95-99% of the vote in presidential elections, with the opposition regularly calling for boycotts. In the 2016 presidential election, however, Obiang won around 93% of the vote, a new low for his presidency.

The party has an extremely narrow base, which is the Esangui clan of the Fang tribe, located in the Mongomo region of Río Muni. Since independence in 1968, Equatorial Guinea has been ruled by a single family; the first president, Francisco Macías Nguema, was overthrown by his nephew, Obiang, in the 1979 coup d'état. The party has been criticized for acting in a very authoritarian manner and teaming up with the government to inform on political dissidents. The party is considered by the vast majority of international observers to be corrupt.

Stances
The PDGE has little in the way of a platform or guiding ideology other than support for Obiang, although it has sometimes been described as pseudo-populist. One of its few concrete policy stances is support of foreign investment in the oil sector. Some of the few other tenets of the PDGE are militarism and anti-separatism (which often amounts to Fang chauvinism).

The community leaders in all of rural Equatorial Guinea are strongly pressured to be members of the party, and also pressure citizens throughout their communities into joining.
  
Although almost all the highest placed political appointments are held by former soldiers, the core military force, the Army, remains somewhat underfunded in favour of naval and air-force maintenance. Government expenditures are equal to less than 10% of GDP, with military expenditures accounting for roughly 25-35% of that figure. The amount of the budget spent on schooling, healthcare and other such investments is in proximity to the military budget. The constitution guarantees that the government will have a monopoly in certain industries, although much has been done to privatise these industries, in similar fashion to the way oil drilling was privatised. The party also has a minister for women, and has in recent years pursued a female empowerment agenda.

Electoral history

Presidential elections

Chamber of Deputies elections

Senate elections

Notes 
15 members of the Senate are appointed by the President

References

External links
Democratic Party of Equatorial Guinea (Spanish)

African and Black nationalist parties in Africa
Political parties in Equatorial Guinea
Parties of one-party systems
Political parties established in 1987